Pristimantis marmoratus (marbled robber frog) is a species of frog in the family Strabomantidae.
It is found in Brazil, French Guiana, Guyana, Suriname, Venezuela, possibly Colombia, and possibly Peru.
Its natural habitats are subtropical or tropical moist lowland forests, subtropical or tropical moist montane forests, plantations, rural gardens, and heavily degraded former forest.

References

marmoratus
Amphibians of Brazil
Amphibians of French Guiana
Amphibians of Guyana
Amphibians of Suriname
Amphibians of Venezuela
Amphibians described in 1900
Taxonomy articles created by Polbot